The Dublin to Sligo main line is a railway route operated by Iarnród Éireann in Ireland. It starts in Dublin Connolly station, terminating at Sligo Mac Diarmada railway station in Sligo. The route is a double-track railway as far as Maynooth, being a single-track railway with passing loops between there and Sligo.

Between Dublin and Longford, the route is operated as part of Dublin Suburban Rail, specifically the Western Commuter service. In 2018, 1.4 million passengers were carried on the line.

History
The extension from Longford to Sligo opened on 3 September 1862.

Route
From Dublin the route mostly bends alongside the Royal Canal to Mullingar along a fairly level gradient. Thereafter there are a number of gradients, with the sustained 1 in 80 between mileposts 75¼ and 70⅜ towards Dublin noted as challenging.

Services
Commuter operates the suburban services between Dublin and Maynooth. These run from Pearse Station, which connects with the line to Rosslare Europort. Some trains run from Bray through to Maynooth.

Two trains per day (Monday to Friday) operate Longford to Pearse in the morning and return from Connolly to Longford in the evening.

InterCity
Monday-Friday
8 trains in each direction Dublin to Sligo
Saturday
7 trains in each direction Dublin to Sligo
Sunday 
6 trains in each direction Dublin to Sligo

Former services in dieselisation era 
There was a basic service pattern of 3 services a day, sometimes supplemented by an additional service from Dublin on Fridays and a very early morning service from Sligo on Monday mornings.  The closure of many stations in 1963 enabled the service to be speeded up with over an hour reduction in journey time.

Freight trains from Sligo stopped when the final trains carrying logs from Sligo ceased in December 2008.

Dublin stations
InterCity services now commence and terminate at Dublin Connolly. Originally Broadstone railway station was the terminus. In the intervening years Pearse Street (Westland Row) was the starting point.

Connections at Dublin Connolly
The line is also used by rail passengers changing at Dublin Connolly onto the DART to Dún Laoghaire or Bray for example or travelling to Dublin Port for the Irish Ferries or Stena Line to Holyhead and then by train along the North Wales Coast Line to London Euston and other destinations in England and Wales.

Dublin Port can be reached by walking beside the tram lines around the corner from Amiens Street into Store Street or by Luas one stop to Busáras where Dublin Bus operates route 53 to the Ferry Terminal or to take a taxi.

Passengers can change at Dublin Connolly for the Belfast–Dublin railway line for the Enterprise to Northern Ireland.

Rolling stock

Current operations
InterCity services have been operated by 22000 Class DMUs since December 2007, the Dublin-Sligo route being the first in the whole of Ireland to get the new trains. They replaced the interim use of 29000 Class Commuter DMUs, which had been introduced to these services in 2005, having in turn replaced locomotive-hauled stock.

Previous dieselisation era operations
InterCity services saw haulage by CIÉ classes 001, 121, 141 and latterly 071 after they were displaced from mainline duties. 121 and 141 Classes would often work in multiple on the heavy midday trains and latterly to achieve faster timetables. The CIE 201 Class was rarer on passenger duties. Coaching stock could reach to about 13 coaches requiring multiple stops at some stations.
Laminate and Park Royal coaching stock including 6-wheel luggage/generator vans were replaced in time by Cravens and eventually Mark 2 coaches with Mark 1 generator vans cascaded from mainline services.

CIÉ 2600 Class AEC DMUs were sometimes used on the morning and evening services up until 1969/70.

See also
Midland Great Western Railway
Sligo, Leitrim and Northern Counties Railway

References

External links

Iarnród Éireann: Line information

Railway lines in Ireland
Railway lines opened in 1847
1847 establishments in Ireland